Ashey is a hamlet on the outskirts of Ryde on the Isle of Wight in southern England. The appropriate civil parish is called Havenstreet and Ashey

Ashey is the site every year of an amateur horse race known as the "Isle of Wight Grand National and Ashey Scurry". There are four races that include jumping over fences. It is open to horses and ponies of all sizes and breeds. Riders of all ages enter. It includes a beer tent and betting.

There was a racecourse opened in Ashey in 1884. It included a grandstand as well. It burned down in 1929 and was never rebuilt.

There is a railway station in Ashey, the Ashey railway station, which reopened in 1991 and is between the stations at Havenstreet and Smallbrook Junction. At one time, there was a separate station that serviced the Ashey Racecourse.

There is a manor in East Ashey called the East Ashey Manor.
Ashey Down is the site of some ancient burial mounds. The summit of Ashey Down is a good viewpoint and this fact has been gratefully accepted by sailors in their use of the solid, white stump - the Ashey sea mark - which was constructed in 1735.  In a variation on the medieval beacon system the Navy built four semaphore stations at key high points on the Island.  These relayed to the admiral at Portsmouth details of all shipping seen off the island, and the final messages all passed through Ashey.

There is a story that in 1969, a Dr. White of St Helens and his wife saw some mysterious lights when driving by Ashey Down at night.

References

External links
Official Scurry event website

Hamlets on the Isle of Wight